Colonel T. G. Watson was the 11th Commander of the Ceylon Defence Force. He was appointed on 1 January 1942 until 1945. He was succeeded by R. A. McGeorge.

References

Commanders of the Ceylon Defence Force
8th King's Royal Irish Hussars officers